Couillet is a town of Wallonia and district of the municipality of Charleroi, located in the province of Hainaut, Belgium.  

It was a municipality of its own before the merger of the municipalities in 1977.

Culture 
The local theater company playing in Walloon language, the "Cercle (royal) wallon de Couillet", won the "Grand Prix du Roi Albert I" Walloon-speaking theater contest in 1932, 1952 and 1976.

Sub-municipalities of Charleroi
Former municipalities of Hainaut (province)